Quva is a district of Fergana Region in Uzbekistan. The capital lies at the city Quva. The district consists of one city (Quva), 15 urban-type settlements (Sanoatchilar, Guliston, Damariq, Jalayer, Qayirma, Qaqir, Qandabuloq, Qorashox, Mustaqillik, Oltinariq, Pastki Xoʻja Xasan, Tolmozor, Turk, Oʻzbek, Yuziya) and 11 rural communities.

References

Districts of Uzbekistan
Fergana Region